Irek Kusmierczyk  (born January 16, 1978) is a Polish-Canadian politician who was elected to represent the riding of Windsor—Tecumseh in the House of Commons of Canada in the 2019 Canadian federal election. Prior to his election in the House of Commons, he was a city councillor for the Windsor City Council representing Ward 7.

He received his PhD in political science from Vanderbilt University,an MA in Central and Eastern European Studies from Jagiellonian University an MSc in government from the London School of Economics, and a Bachelor of Journalism from Carleton University. He worked in government at the Ministry of Foreign Affairs as an Atlantic Council of Canada Fellow and published a book chapter on cross-border environmental cooperation between local governments around the Great Lakes basin. He worked on Species-at-Risk remediation around Ojibway Park as part of the Windsor Essex Parkway Project.

He was born in Kraśnik, Poland. His family arrived in Canada in 1983 as political refugees after his father was imprisoned as a member of the Solidarity movement, which opposed the communist dictatorship and established the first free and independent trade union in communist Eastern Europe. They immediately settled in Windsor where his father worked as an engineer in the automotive industry.

Electoral record

Federal

Municipal

References

External links

1978 births
Alumni of the London School of Economics
Carleton University alumni
Living people
Liberal Party of Canada MPs
People from Kraśnik
Polish emigrants to Canada
Members of the House of Commons of Canada from Ontario
Vanderbilt University alumni
Windsor, Ontario city councillors